Camel (1822 – 6 November 1844) was a British Thoroughbred racehorse. He won five of his seven races, including the Port Stakes in 1825, but his appearances were limited by leg problems. Throughout his racing career he was owned by Charles Wyndham. After retiring from racing Camel became a successful stallion, siring St. Leger winners Touchstone and Launcelot and becoming British Champion sire in 1838.

Background
Camel was a brown colt bred by George Wyndham, 3rd Earl of Egremont, and foaled in 1822. He was sired by Whalebone, who won the Newmarket Stakes and Epsom Derby in 1834. After retiring from racing he was a successful stallion, becoming Champion sire twice. Amongst his other progeny were Derby winners Lap-dog and Spaniel, as well as the top sire Sir Hercules. Camel's dam was an unnamed daughter of Selim. Camel was owned by Egremont's son Charles Wyndham.

Racing career
Camel was due to race the colt Peter Proteus in a match race at Newmarket on 21 April 1825, but Peter Proteus paid a forfeit and was withdrawn. They following day he contested the Newmarket Stakes, facing eight rivals. Cramer was the pre-race favourite at 6/4, with Camel second favourite at 3/1. The race was won by 17/1 outsider Crockery, with Camel finishing second. On 3 May he started as the 5/4 favourite for a £50 race for three-year-olds over the Rowley Mile at Newmarket. Ridden by W. Arnull, Camel won the race from Adeliza. At Newmarket's Second October meeting he beat Dahlia, Mortgage and 1000 Guineas winner Tontine in a race for one-third of a subscription of 25 sovereigns each. At the beginning of November he beat Tarandus in a match race over five and a half furlongs at Newmarket. Two days later Camel lost a match against the filly Scandel.

Camel only raced once in 1826, when he started as the 7/4 favourite for the Port Stakes at Newmarket. Ridden as usual by Arnull, he won the race from Redgauntlet, with Lionel Lincoln finishing in third place. Two others finished behind Lionel Lincoln, but were not placed by the judge. He was scheduled to run in the Garden Stakes in October, but was withdrawn from the race, which was won by Bizarre. He raced only once again in 1827, after suffering with leg problems since his win in the Port Stakes. This was at Newmarket in October, where he beat Redgauntlet easily by two lengths over one mile.

Stud career
Camel initially stood as a stallion at Earl Grosvenor's Eaton Stud near Chester. In 1830 he stood for a fee of ten guineas and half a guinea for the groom. He became a successful stallion and was the leading sire in Great Britain and Ireland in 1838. His most important progeny were:

 Touchstone (1831) – won the St. Leger in 1834. He sired many classic winners, including Cotherstone, Orlando, Surplice and Newminster.
 Caravan (1834) – won the Ascot Gold Cup.
 Prism (1836) – foaled The Oaks winner Refraction.
 Black Bess (1837) – was the dam of 2000 Guineas winner Hernandez.
 Launcelot (1837) – won the St. Leger in 1840.
 Fiammetta (1838) – won the Poule d'Essai.
 Misdeal (1839) – won the St. James's Palace Stakes.

Camel died on 6 November 1844.

Pedigree

Note: b. = Bay, bl. = Black, br. = Brown, ch. = Chestnut

* Camel was inbred 4x4 to Highflyer. This means that the stallion appears twice in the fourth generation of her pedigree.

References

1822 racehorse births
1844 racehorse deaths
British Champion Thoroughbred Sires
Racehorses bred in the United Kingdom
Racehorses trained in the United Kingdom
Thoroughbred family 24